Poland does not legally recognize same-sex unions, either in the form of marriage or civil unions. In 2012, the Supreme Court ruled that same-sex couples have limited legal rights in regards to the tenancy of a shared household. A few laws also guarantee certain limited rights for unmarried couples, including couples of the same sex. Same-sex spouses also have access to residency rights under EU law.

Article 18 of the Polish Constitution, adopted in 1997, was frequently interpreted as banning same-sex marriage, but the latest (2019) court ruling states that it does not preclude their existence.

Unregistered cohabitation
While Poland does not have a specific law on cohabitation, there are some provisions in various legal acts or Supreme Court rulings that recognise relations between unmarried partners and grant them specific rights and obligations. For example, Article 115(11) of the Penal Code uses the term "the closest person", which covers romantic relations that are not legally formalised. The status of "the closest person" gives the right of refusal to testify against the partner. The term "partner" is not explicitly defined. A March 2016 landmark decision of the Supreme Court regarding same-sex partners' rights confirmed that the wording also includes same-sex partners.

Other laws also provide limited recognition for same-sex couples. For instance, since 2004, when one partner is entitled to social benefits, the income of the other partner is also taken into consideration. Under Article 6.14 of the Social Aid Act of 12 March 2004, entitlement to social benefits is dependent on the income per person in a family. The term "family" is used in the act to refer to people who are married, in a de facto partnership, living together and have a common household. Since 2008, if one partner suffers an accident or is seriously ill, the other partner is considered as a next of kin for medical purposes. Under Article 3.1(2) of the Patients' Rights Act of 6 November 2008, the definition of "next of kin" includes a "person in a durable partnership".

A resolution of the Supreme Court from 28 November 2012 (III CZP 65/12) on the interpretation of the term "a person who has lived actually in cohabitation with the tenant" was issued with regard to the case of a gay man who was the partner of a deceased person, the main tenant of the apartment. The Court interpreted the law in a way that recognised the surviving partner as authorised to take over the right to tenancy. The Court stated that the person actually remaining in cohabitation with the tenant - in the meaning of Article 691 § 1 of the Civil Code - is a person connected with the tenant by a bond of emotional, physical and economic nature. This also includes a person of the same sex. Previously, in March 2010, the European Court of Human Rights ruled, in the case of Kozak v. Poland, that LGBT people have the right to inherit from their partners.

In one case in 2011, a Polish writer, Izabela Filipiak, managed to get a residency card for her American partner.

In 2018, a lesbian couple was granted the right to register their British-born son as their own.

Limited symbolic recognition
In 2004, the Warsaw Public Transport Authority's decision to allow cohabiting partners of gay and lesbian employees to travel free on the city's public transport system was the first case of recognition of same-sex couples in Poland. In 2007, a decision of Chorzów's City Center of Social Assistance recognized persons living in a common relationship in the same household as a family, for various purposes associated with the center.

At the end of 2010, a court in Złotów decided that the same-sex partner of a woman who had died was entitled to continue the lease on their communal apartment. The municipality appealed the verdict, but the District Court in Poznań rejected the appeal. Thus, the decision of the Złotów court became final. "The court found that these women actually remained in a stable partnership. Any other interpretation would lead to discrimination based on sexual orientation," said the president of the District Court in Złotów, Adam Jutrzenka-Trzebiatowski.

2018 European Court of Justice ruling

	
On 5 June 2018, the European Court of Justice (ECJ) ruled that European Union member states (including Poland) must recognise the freedom of movement and residency rights of same-sex spouses, provided one partner is an EU citizen. The Court ruled that EU member states may choose whether or not to allow same-sex marriage, but they cannot obstruct the freedom of residence of an EU citizen and their spouse. Furthermore, the Court ruled that the term "spouse" is gender-neutral, and that it does not necessarily imply a person of the opposite sex.

Registered partnerships

Before 2005
The first legislative proposal to recognise unregistered cohabiting couples (including same-sex couples) was proposed in 2002, but did not advance.

In 2004, under a left-wing government, the Senate approved a bill allowing gay and lesbian couples to register their relationships as civil unions. The civil unions proposed by the bill would have given couples a range of benefits, protections and responsibilities currently granted only to opposite-sex married couples, including pension funds, joint tax and death-related benefits, but did not grant the right to adopt children. The bill was passed with 38 votes in favour, 23 against and 15 abstentions. It lapsed due to the 2005 general election.

Only two parties, the Democratic Left Alliance-Labour Union (SLD) and the Social Democracy of Poland (both social democratic parties) supported the bill, while Civic Platform (PO), the League of Polish Families and Law and Justice (PiS) opposed it. Samoobrona was neutral, and the Polish People's Party (PSL) did not take a position.

2005–2011
A new registered partnership bill was proposed to the Government of Civic Platform and the Polish People's Party in late 2007, but was rejected. In 2008, a new fourth bill on registered partnerships was being prepared by the opposition SLD, but stood no chance of being passed in the Parliament and was therefore never introduced.

In June 2009, gay and lesbian organisations submitted a petition calling for registered partnerships to the Speaker of the Sejm, Bronisław Komorowski (PO). By this point, some politicians from parties opposed to same-sex unions, including Jerzy Buzek (PO) and Michał Kamiński (PiS), had expressed support for certain rights being granted to same-sex couples. Attitudes from some representatives of the church had also changed. In January 2010, the opposition SLD, in consultation with gay and lesbian organisations, prepared a new draft law on registered partnerships, modelled on the bill approved by the Senate in 2004 and similar to the French pacte civil de solidarité (PACS). However, the bill had no chance of getting passed in Parliament as PO, PiS and PSL announced that they would not support the bill.

On 17 May 2011, the SLD presented a draft law on registered partnerships, which would regulate the relationships of same-sex and opposite-sex unmarried couples, similar to the French PACS law. Agnieszka Pomaska, Deputy Secretary-General of the Platforma Obywatelska, commented that it was time to discuss the legal regulation of informal relationships, both opposite-sex and same-sex and that PO was open to discussing registered partnerships. Prime Minister Donald Tusk (PO) announced that the law on registered partnerships would be passed at the beginning of the next term of the Sejm, but Speaker of the Sejm Grzegorz Schetyna (PO) said that a vote would not be put to Parliament during that legislative term. However, after receiving a petition in favour of the registered partnership bill signed by 23,500 people, Speaker Schetyna declared that he would probably submit the bill for its first reading in Parliament after 10 July 2011. Krzysztof Tyszkiewicz, spokesman of the PO parliamentary group, announced that the party would support the SLD bill, but only after the parliamentary elections in October 2011.

In July 2011, the Social and Family Policy Commission and the Justice and Human Rights Commission held a first reading of the registered partnership bill. Out of the 67 (32 PO, 23 PiS, 7 SLD, 2 PSL, 3 non-attached) members of the committees, 29 voted in favour, 10 voted against and 3 abstained.

After the bill passed its first reading in the Sejm, the Supreme Court of Poland expressed its opinion on 9 October 2011, before the elections. The Court undermined any further progress of the bill, highlighting numerous legal deficiencies. It also stated that the registration of cohabiting opposite-sex couples was incompatible with Article 18 of the Polish Constitution. Regarding the relationships of same-sex couples, it stated that the admissibility and scope of any statutory regulation required an analysis taking into account international legal obligations, and considering the implications of recent judgments by the European Court of Human Rights. According to Professor Miroslaw Wyrzykowski, head of the Department of Human Rights at the University of Warsaw's Faculty of Law, and a former judge of the Polish Constitutional Court, the Constitution requires the introduction of civil partnerships. In the end, the bill was never voted upon by Parliament and therefore expired.

2011–2015
After the parliamentary elections of 9 October 2011, Janusz Palikot, the leader of the Palikot Movement (RP), declared that a bill on civil partnerships would be one of the first draft laws submitted to the new Parliament. Leszek Miller, head of the SLD parliamentary grouping, announced that they would reintroduce the same bill as had been introduced in the previous parliaments. Rafał Grupiński, vice president of the PO parliamentary grouping, announced that its members would have a free vote on the draft law. Stanisław Żelichowski, head of the PSL parliamentary grouping, said that he expected the SLD's bill to be mostly ignored by Parliament.

A new draft law based on the one adopted by the Senate in 2004 (similar to the Scandinavian model, not the French PACS), applying to same-sex couples only, would be prepared and submitted to Parliament in early December 2011, as a joint initiative of the SLD and the RP. Some members of the PO also declared their support. PSL did not state a firm position on the issue but was believed to be in support. Only PiS were opposed, though some of its members, such as Witold Waszczykowski, signalled their support.

Polish MEP Agnieszka Kozlowska-Rajewicz described the adoption of the law on civil partnerships as one of her priorities, though she added that the ideal would be the introduction of same-sex marriage. She also said that civil partnerships similar to the French PACS were the form of unions over which there was agreement at the time and that the law would be enacted in that parliamentary term. Separately, a government report, entitled Poland 2030 Third wave of modernity – Long-term National Development Strategy, stated that an objective for the five-year period to 2015 should be the equalization of rights for stable unmarried couples. Arthur Dunin (PO) commented that many PO parliamentarians saw the need for such a partnership law, provided that it did not go too far. Such a law, which would enable the legal recognition of both same-sex and opposite-sex couples, would be similar to the French PACS, and would also have the support of conservative members of the PO.

On 13 January 2012, the SLD and RP jointly presented two draft laws on civil partnerships to the Sejm. The first bill was the same that had failed in the previous Sejm, similar to the French PACS law (for same-sex and opposite-sex couples), whereas the second bill was similar to the Scandinavian model (for same-sex couples only). The PO intended to introduce its own bill, similar to the French PACS law but including some differences between civil unions and marriages, as required for consistency with the Constitution. On 28 June, the Legislative Committee expressed the opinion that both bills were unconstitutional. On 24 July, the Polish Sejm voted against the submission for a first reading on the two bills. One day later, the Civic Platform (PO) proposed its own bill on "civil partnership agreements", which was submitted to the Parliament in September.

All three drafts were rejected on 25 January 2013 by the plenary session of the Sejm, with the most narrow defeat being for the bill proposed by Civic Platform, which lost by 211–228.

2015–present
Following the 2015 parliamentary elections, the socially conservative PiS, which is opposed to registered partnerships, formed the new Government.

A new registered partnership bill was proposed on 12 February 2018 by the Modern party. It was introduced to the Sejm in April 2018.

European Court of Human Rights cases
In July 2020, the European Court of Human Rights notified the Polish government of cases filed by Polish same-sex couples, inviting the Polish government to present its position on the issue (Andersen v. Poland). Based on the precedents of Oliari and Others v Italy, in which the court found that "the absence of a legal framework allowing for recognition and protection of [applicants] relationship violates their rights under Article 8 of the Convention", and Orlandi and Others v. Italy, in which the ECtHR ruled that Italy must recognize same-sex marriages performed in other jurisdictions, advocates hope that the cases will lead to legal recognition of same-sex relationships in Poland. If a friendly settlement is not reached, the cases will take months or years to go to trial.

Same-sex marriage
Article 18 of the Constitution of Poland states that:

The article was adopted in 1997. The purpose of the article has been to ensure that legislators would not be able to legalize same-sex marriage without changing the Constitution. Jurists have generally interpreted it as a constitutional ban on same-sex marriage. Several lawyers and jurists have argued that the article does not formally define marriage, and while promoting opposite-sex marriages, does not in itself ban same-sex marriage.

On 7 July 2004, the Supreme Court stated that: 

On 11 May 2005, the Constitutional Tribunal ruled that:

On 9 November 2010, the Constitutional Tribunal held that:

On 25 October 2016, the Supreme Administrative Court of Poland stated that:

In 2018, ruling on the recognition of foreign same-sex marriages, the Supreme Administrative Court of Poland ruled that "Article 18 of the Constitution of the Republic of Poland, which defines marriage as a union of a man and a woman, [...] requires to treat only a heterosexual union as a marriage in Poland". Specifically, the court ruled that registering same-sex marriages performed outside of Poland would breach the Constitution and the Private International Law Act.

Seeking to test the legal wording, a same-sex couple, vloggers Jakub and Dawid, applied to have their Portuguese marriage recognised. Their application was rejected by the Civil Registry in Warsaw, but they appealed to a Voivode. After their case was rejected by the Voivode, they filed suit. On 8 January 2019, the Wojewódzki Sąd Administracyjny w Warszawie, the administrative court for the Masovian Voivodeship, ruled that their marriage could not be recognised under Polish law. However, it did rule that should the Family Code and other statutes provide for the institution of same-sex marriage than article 18 would not provide a direct obstacle. The Campaign Against Homophobia praised the ruling, while the Ministry of Justice questioned the court's legal authority. The couple sought legal advice on whether to appeal certain parts of the ruling, namely those pertaining to the refusal to recognise their marriage.

Public opinion
Social attitudes towards the recognition of same-sex couples and their families seem to be changing, based on recent opinion polls. Recent polls have found conflicting numbers in relation to same-sex registered partnerships, with some pollsters finding majorities against, but others finding majorities in support. In general, however, a trend in favor of registered partnerships and LGBTQ rights has been observed over the years. A majority of Poles oppose same-sex marriage and adoption.

The 2015 Eurobarometer found that 28% of Poles thought that same-sex marriage should be allowed throughout Europe, 61% were against. This was an 11% increase from the previous Eurobarometer, which was conducted in 2006. Additionally, the number of those who "strongly opposed" same-sex marriage almost halved from 2006 to 2015. The 2019 Eurobarometer found a large increase in support, with 45% of Poles in support of same-sex marriage, and 50% opposed. This increase of 17% was the second-highest in the European Union, after Germany at 18%. Of countries forming the former Eastern Bloc (excluding East Germany), Poland ranked second in support for same-sex marriage, after the Czech Republic.

Views on homosexuality 
In September 2021, the percentage of respondents who personally know someone LGBT reached a record 43%. Respondents were also asked whether they agreed that:
 homosexuality is not normal and must not be tolerated (17%)
 homosexuality is a deviation from the norm, but it should be tolerated (51%)
 homosexuality is normal (23%)
 Hard to say (9%)

In total, 74% of Poles tolerate homosexuality, while 17% do not.

CBOS polls

The 2013 poll found that support for same-sex registered partnerships varied significantly by political parties. 68% of Your Movement (formerly RP) voters supported registered partnerships, 56% of SLD voters, 50% of PO voters, 24% of PSL voters and 15% of PiS voters.

Support for registered partnerships is higher among young people, people who have a higher education, who live in big cities, who have a higher income, who are less religious and who are politically left-wing.

IBRiS polls

2012 CEAPP poll

PBS polls

2013 OBOP poll

Other polls

See also 
 LGBT rights in Poland
 LGBT rights in the European Union
 Recognition of same-sex unions in Europe
 Article 18

References

External links
 Warsaw GayGuide.Net Up2date GayGuide for Warsaw and Poland

LGBT rights in Poland
Poland